Krishnanagar Sadar subdivision is an administrative subdivision of Nadia district in the state of West Bengal, India.

Overview
Nadia district is part of the large alluvial plain formed by the Ganges-Bhagirathi system. The plains spread southwards from the head of the delta. The Krishnanagar Sadar subdivision has the Bhagirathi on the west, with Purba Bardhaman district lying across the river. The long stretch along the Bhagirathi has many swamps. The area between the Bhagirathi and the Jalangi, which flows through the middle of the subdivision, is known as Kalantar, a low-lying tract of black clay soil. A big part of the subdivision forms the Krishnanagar-Santipur Plain, which occupies the central part of the district. The Jalangi, after flowing through the middle of the subdivision, turns right and joins the Bhagirathi. On the south-east, the Churni separates the Krishnanagar-Santipur Plain from the Ranaghat-Chakdaha Plain. A portion of the east forms the boundary with Bangladesh. The area had large forests. The huge influx of East Bengali refugees that took place in the district immediately after the partition of India and the steady influx ever since paved way for conversion of forest into agricultural land.

Subdivisions
Nadia district is divided into the following administrative subdivisions:

Administrative units
Krishnanagar Sadar subdivision has 8 police stations, 7 community development blocks, 7 panchayat samitis, 77 gram panchayats, 534 mouzas, 487 inhabited villages 2 municipalities and 16 census towns. The municipalities are: Krishnanagar and Nabadwip. The census towns are: Mira, Matiari, Jagadanandapur, Kshidirpur, Chapra, Sonda, Baruihuda, Paschimbhatjangla, Bamanpukur, Tiorkhali, Bablari Dewanganj, Gadigachha, Majdia, Char Maijdia and Char Brahmanagar.

The subdivision has its headquarters at Krishnanagar.

Police stations
Police stations in Krishnanagar Sadar subdivision have the following features and jurisdiction:

Blocks
Community development blocks in Krishnanagar Sadar subdivision are:

Gram Panchayats
The subdivision contains 77 gram panchayats under 7 community development blocks:

Kaliganj block consists of 15 gram panchayats, viz. Barachandghar, Hatgachha, Mira–I, Palitbegia, Debagram, Juranpur, Mira–II, Panighata, Faridpur, Kaliganj, Plassey–I, Rajarampur Ghoraikhetra, Gobra, Matiari and Plassey–II.

Nakashipara block consists of 15 gram panchayats, viz. Bethuadahari-1, Billwagram, Dharmada, Muragachha, Bethua Dahari–II, Birpur–I, Dogachhia, Nakasipara, Bikrampur, Birpur–II, Haranagar, Patikabari, Bilkumari, Dhananjaypur and Majhergram.

Chapra block consists of 13 gram panchayats, viz. Alfa, Chapra–II, Hridaypur, Pipragachhi, Bagberia, Hatisala–I, Kalinga, Brittihuda, Hatisala–II, Mahatpur, Chapra–I, Hatkhola and Maheshpur.

Krishnanagar I block consists of 12 gram panchayats, viz. Assannagar, Bhatjungla, Dignagar, Joania, Bhaluka, Bhimpur, Dogachi, Poragachha, Bhandarkhola, Chakdilnagar, Daypara and Ruipukur.

Krishnanagar II block consists of seven gram panchayats, viz. Belpukur, Dhubulia–II, Naopara–II, Sadhanpara–II, Dhubulia–I, Naopara–I and Sadhanpara–I.

Nabadwip block consists of eight gram panchayats, viz. Bablari, Mahisura, Mayapur Bamanpukur–II, Charmajdia Charbrahmanagar, Majdia Pansila, Mayapur Bamanpukur–I, Swarupganj and Fakirdanga Gholapara.

Krishnaganj block consists of seven gram panchayats, viz. Bhajanghat Tungi, Joyghata, Matiary, Taldah Majdia, Gobindapur, Krishnaganj and Shibnibas.

Education
Nadia district had a literacy rate of 74.97% as per the provisional figures of the census of India 2011. Tehatta subdivision had a literacy rate of 67.25%, Krishnanagar Sadar subdivision 71.03%, Ranaghat subdivision 79.51% and Kalyani subdivision 83.35.  

Given in the table below (data in numbers) is a comprehensive picture of the education scenario in Nadia district for the year 2013-14:

Note: Primary schools include junior basic schools; middle schools, high schools and higher secondary schools include madrasahs; technical schools include junior technical schools, junior government polytechnics, industrial technical institutes, industrial training centres, nursing training institutes etc.; technical and professional colleges include engineering colleges, medical colleges, para-medical institutes, management colleges, teachers training and nursing training colleges, law colleges, art colleges, music colleges etc. Special and non-formal education centres include sishu siksha kendras, madhyamik siksha kendras, centres of Rabindra mukta vidyalaya, recognised Sanskrit tols, institutions for the blind and other handicapped persons, Anganwadi centres, reformatory schools etc.

The following institutions are located in Krishnanagar subdivision:
Krishnagar Government College was established at Krishnanagar in 1846. It is affiliated to the University of Kalyani. It offers honours courses in Bengali, English, Sanskrit, philosophy, history, political science, economics, physics, chemistry, mathematics, botany, zoology, physiology and geography. It has facilities for MA in philosophy and Bengali, and M.Sc. in geography and zoology. There are 2 hostels for boys.
Dwijendralal College was established at Krishnanagar in 1968. It is affiliated to the University of Kalyani. It offers honours courses in Bengali, English, Sanskrit, history, philosophy, political science, geography and B.Com.
Krishnagar Women's College was established at Krishnanagar in 1958. It is affiliated to the University of Kalyani and offers undergraduate courses in arts and science.
Bethuadahari College was established at Bethuadahari in 1986. It is affiliated to the University of Kalyani. It offers honours courses in Bengali, history, geography, political science and accountancy. Local traders, cultivators, agricultural labourers, hawkers, rickshaw pullers, porters and other citizens contributed extensively either by extending financial help or by offering manual labour to build the college.
Kaliganj Government College was established at Debagram in 2015. Affiliated to the University of Kalyani, it offers honours courses in Bengali, English, Sanskrit, history, botany and physiology. Commerce course will start in 2017-18 session.
Nabadwip Vidyasagar College was established at Nabadwip in 1942. It initially functioned as a branch of Vidyasagar College, Kolkata, but started functioning as an independent college from 1948. Affiliated to the University of Kalyani, it offers honours courses in Bengali, English, Sanskrit, history, political science, philosophy, education, physics, chemistry, mathematics, zoology, botany, environmental science and accountancy.
Chapra Bangaljhi Mahavidyalaya was established at Bangaljhi in 2001. Affiliated to the University of Kalyani, it offers honours courses in Bengali, English, Sanskrit, history, geography, political science, philosophy, education and sociology.
Sudhiranjan Lahiri Mahavidyalaya was established at Majhdia in 1966. Affiliated to the University of Kalyani, it offers courses in Bengali, English, history, political science, sociology, philosophy, geography and B.Com.
Asannagar Madan Mohan Tarkalankar College was established at Asannagar in 2007. Affiliated to the University of Kalyani, it offers honours courses in Bengali, English, Sanskrit and history.

Healthcare
The table below (all data in numbers) presents an overview of the medical facilities available and patients treated in the hospitals, health centres and sub-centres in 2014 in Nadia district.  
 

.* Excluding nursing homes

Medical facilities
Medical facilities in Krishnanagr Sadar subdivision are as follows:

Hospitals in Krishnanagar Sadar subdivision: (Name, location, beds)
B.S.F Camp Hospital, Chapra Seema Nagar, 25 beds
Dr. B.C.Roy Chest Sanatorium, Dhubulia, 1000 beds
Krishnanagar Jail Hospital, Krishnanagar, 33 beds
Krishnanagar Police Hospital, Krishnanagar, 46 beds
Nadia District Hospital, Krishnanagar, 495 beds
Nabadwip State General Hospital, Nabadwip, 125 beds

Rural Hospitals: (Name, block, location, beds)
Kaliganj Rural Hospital, Kaliganj CD Block, Juranpur, 25 beds
Krishnaganj Rural Hospital, Krishnaganj CD Block, Krishnaganj, 25 beds
Bethudahari Rural Hospital, Nakasipara CD Block, Bethuadahari, 60 beds
Chapra Rural Hospital, Chapra CD Block, Bangaljhi, 25 beds
Maheshganj Rural Hospital, Nabadwip CD Block, Maheshganj, 30 beds
Bishnupur Rural Hospital, Krishnanagar I CD Block, Bishnupur, 30 beds
Dhubulia Rural Hospital, Krishnanagar II CD Block, Dhubulia, 30 beds

Primary Health Centres (CD Block-wise)(CD Block, PHC location, beds) 
Kaliganj CD Block: Debagram (10 beds), Juranpur (10 beds), Matiari (6 beds), Mira (10 beds), Panighata (20 beds).
Krishnaganj CD Block: Matiari (Banpur) (10 beds), Joyghata (4 beds), Bhajanghat (6 beds). 
Nakashipara CD Block: Chakghurni (4 beds), Dharmada (10 beds), Majhergram (6 beds), Nakashipara (Dadpur) (10 beds).
Nabadwip CD Block: Sree Mayapur (10 beds), Fakirdanga (2 beds).
Chapra CD Block: Hridaypur (10 beds), Bagberia (6 beds).
Krishnanagar I CD Block: Asannagar (10 beds), Bhaluka (6 beds).
Krishnanagar II CD Block: Noapara (10 beds), Belpur (6 beds).

Electoral constituencies
Lok Sabha (parliamentary) and Vidhan Sabha (state assembly) constituencies in Krishnanagar Sadar subdivision were as follows:

References

Subdivisions of West Bengal
Subdivisions in Nadia district
Krishnanagar